is a Japanese voice actor, narrator, and singer. He debuted as a voice actor in 2009. Notable roles played by him include Hyōga Yukimura from Inazuma Eleven Go, Shin Ichijo from the King of Prism series, Takeru Taiga from The Idolmaster: SideM, Code from Boruto: Naruto Next Generations and Hisoka Mikage from A3!. In addition to voice acting, Terashima also started a singing career in 2019 with the release of the extended plays 29 + 1: Miso and Joy Source.

On January 15, 2021, Terashima tested positive for COVID-19.

Discography

Extended plays

Filmography

Anime

Film

Video games

Dubbing
The Bears' Famous Invasion of Sicily (Tonio)

References

External links
 

Japanese male pop singers
Japanese male video game actors
Japanese male voice actors
Living people
1988 births